Washington Township is one of eleven townships in Randolph County, Indiana. As of the 2010 census, its population was 2,172 and it contained 955 housing units.

History
Washington Township was established in 1831.

Geography

Cities and towns
 Lynn

Unincorporated towns
 Bloomingport at 
 Carlos at 
 Rural at 
 Snow Hill at 
(This list is based on USGS data and may include former settlements.)

References

External links
 Indiana Township Association
 United Township Association of Indiana

Townships in Randolph County, Indiana
Townships in Indiana